The 29th Vanier Cup was played on November 20, 1993, at the SkyDome in Toronto, Ontario, and decided the CIAU football champion for the 1993 season. The Toronto Varsity Blues won their second championship by defeating the Calgary Dinos by a score of 37-34.

References

External links
 Official website

Vanier Cup
Vanier Cup
1993 in Toronto
November 1993 sports events in Canada